Teufaiva Sport Stadium which was previously known as Tenefaira Field Stadium is a multi-purpose stadium in Nukualofa, Tonga. It is used mostly for rugby union, football and rugby league and the Ikale Tahi team matches. The stadium holds 10,000 people. It is the home ground of the Tonga national rugby union team. Teufaiva is where the Secondary School sports in Tonga are held (every year). 

The stadium fell into disrepair in the early 2000s and was unused for eight years. It was reopened after being refurbished in 2017, but badly damaged by Cyclone Gita just a few months later. It was re-opened again in 2019.

References

Athletics (track and field) venues in Tonga
Football venues in Tonga
Rugby league stadiums in Tonga
Rugby union stadiums in Tonga
Tonga
Buildings and structures in Nukuʻalofa
Multi-purpose stadiums in Oceania
Tonga national rugby union team
Tonga national football team